Jehan le Taintenier or Jean Teinturier (Latinised as Johannes Tinctoris; also Jean de Vaerwere;  – 1511) was a Renaissance music theorist and composer from the Low Countries. Up to his time, he is perhaps the most significant European writer on music since Guido of Arezzo.

Life and career
He is known to have studied in Orléans, and to have been master of the choir there; he also may have been director of choirboys at Chartres.  Because he was paid through the office of petites vicars at Cambrai Cathedral for four months in 1460, it has been speculated that he studied with Du Fay, who spent the last part of his life there; certainly Tinctoris must at least have known the elder Burgundian there. Tinctoris went to Naples about 1472 and spent most of the rest of his life in Italy.

Tinctoris was also known as a cleric, a poet, a mathematician, and a lawyer; there is even one reference to him as an accomplished painter.

Works
Tinctoris published many volumes of writings on music.  While they are not particularly original, borrowing heavily from ancient writers (including Boethius, Isidore of Seville, and others) they give an impressively detailed record of the technical practices and procedures used by composers of the day.  He wrote the first dictionary of musical terms (the Diffinitorium musices); a book on the characteristics of the musical modes; a treatise on proportions; and three books on counterpoint, which is particularly useful in charting the development of voice-leading and harmony in the transitional period between Du Fay and Josquin. The writings by Tinctoris were influential on composers and other music theorists for the remainder of the Renaissance.

While not much of the music of Tinctoris has survived, that which has survived shows a love for complex, smoothly flowing polyphony, as well as a liking for unusually low tessituras, occasionally descending in the bass voice to the C two octaves below middle C (showing an interesting similarity to Ockeghem in this regard). Tinctoris wrote masses, motets and a few chansons.

Tinctoris' eight rules of composition
From his third book on counterpoint.

Rule #1 Begin and finish with perfect consonance. It is, however, not wrong if the singer is improvising a counterpoint and ends with imperfect consonance, but in that case, the movement should be many-voiced.  Sixth or octave doubling of the bass is not allowed.

Rule #2 Follow together with ténor up and down in imperfect and perfect consonances of the same kind. (Parallels at the third and sixth are recommended, fifth and octave parallels are forbidden.)

Rule #3 If ténor remains on the same note, you can add both perfect and imperfect consonances.

Rule #4 The counterpointed part should have a melodic closed form even if ténor makes big leaps.

Rule #5 Do not put cadence on a note if it ruins the development of the melody.

Rule #6 It is forbidden to repeat the same melodic turn above a cantus firmus, especially if the cantus firmus contains that same repetition.

Rule #7 Avoid two or more consecutive cadences of the same pitch even if cantus firmus allows it.

Rule #8 In all counterpoint, try to achieve manifoldness and variety by altering measure, tempo, and cadences. Use syncopes, imitations, canons, and pauses. But remember that an ordinary chanson uses fewer different styles than a motet and a motet uses fewer different styles than a mass.

Musical Compositions

Sacred music

Masses:
 Missa sine nomine #1 (3 v)
 Missa sine nomine #2
 Missa sine nomine #3 (missing Kyrie and Agnus Dei)
 Missa L'homme armé

Motets:
 O Virgo miserere mei
 Virgo Dei throno digna
 Alleluya
 Fecit potentiam
 Lamentatio Jeremiae

Secular music
 Helas
 Vostre regart
 O invida fortuna
 Le souvenir (4v)
 Le souvenir (2v)
 Tout a par moy
 De tous biens playne
 D'ung aultre amer
 Comme femme

Notable writings
the first dictionary of musical terms (Diffinitorum musices, c. 1475)
an introduction to the elements of musical pitch and rhythmic notation (Expositio manus and Proportionale musices); examples show how rhythmically elaborate extemporization may have been practiced
a thorough exposition of the modal system (Liber de natura et proprietate tonorum)
Liber de arte contrapuncti – his main exposition of intervals, consonance and dissonance, and their usage. He devised strict rules for introducing dissonances, limiting them to unstressed beats and syncopations (suspensions) and at cadences.
a broad survey of the origins and evolution of music, its theological and metaphysical roots and ramifications, and vocal and instrumentation practice (De inventione et usu musice).

Writings
 Tinctoris, Johannes, Liber de arte contrapuncti, tr. Oliver Strunk, in Source Readings in Music History.  New York, W.W. Norton & Co., 1950.
 Tinctoris, Johannes,  Opus musices. Naples,  c. 1483. Digitized codex at Somni
 Tinctoris, Johanni, Opera Omnia, Corpus Mensurabilis Musicae 18, ed. William Melan, American Institute of Musicology, 1976

References

Further reading

 
 
 Palenik, Jeffrey, "The early career of Johannes Tinctoris: An examination of the music theorists Northern education and development". PhD Diss., Duke University: 2008.

External links
 Latin text of works by Tinctoris on the Thesaurus Musicarum Latinarum of the Indiana University Jacobs School of Music

1435 births
1511 deaths
Renaissance composers
Belgian music theorists
French classical composers
French male classical composers
15th-century Franco-Flemish composers
16th-century Franco-Flemish composers